Jarlath Henderson (born 1986) is a Northern Irish folk musician. He is best known as an Uilleann piper and singer but also plays the guitar and flute. He was the youngest winner of the BBC Radio 2 Young Folk Award in 2003. Through his career, he has worked with bands and musicians such as Lau, Capercaillie, Julie Fowlis, Michael McGoldrick, Paddy Keenan, Salsa Celtica, Phil Cunningham, Buille, Dougie Maclean and Jack Bruce. He has also worked with Boris Grebenshikov of Aquarium on the album House of All Saints. In 2016, he released his first solo album, Hearts Broken, Heads Turned. In 2019, he released Raw. As of 2016 he is a member of the band Atlantic Arc, led by Dónal Lunny.

Henderson was born in Armagh but grew up in Dungannon. He studied medicine at the University of Aberdeen before moving to Glasgow to work as a junior doctor. Henderson works full time as both a musician and a doctor. Jarlath Henderson is the brother of the Northern Irish musician and actress Alana Henderson.

References

External links

Bonus Episode: Jarlath Henderson at the Isle of Skye Festival of Small Halls

People from Armagh (city)
People from Dungannon
Folk musicians from Northern Ireland
Uilleann pipers from Northern Ireland
Medical doctors from Northern Ireland
Living people
Musicians from County Armagh
Musicians from County Tyrone
Vertical Records artists

Alumni of the University of Aberdeen
1986 births